Lyceum was an open-source blogging platform based on WordPress. It was developed by ibiblio, but development ceased in 2010.

History
Lyceum was first made public in February 2006. It originally began in mid-2005, and development is synchronous with WordPress. As of March 2009, Lyceum was based on an old version of WordPress and was inactive while the developer considered whether or not to resume development. In May 2010, its maintainer John Bachir announced that the project was discontinued.

Differences from WordPress MU
WordPress MU, developed by the core WordPress team, is extremely similar in functionality to Lyceum. The primary difference is that Lyceum stores all of its information in a set number of database tables (it has a normalized schema). WordPress MU, on the other hand, adds new tables for each weblog added (it has a sharded schema).

See also

 List of content management systems
 WordPress

References

External links
 
 Article in Red Hat Magazine by John Bachir

Blog software
WordPress
Free content management systems